This was the first election in Massachusetts after the separation of the former District of Maine as the new State of Maine, taking the old  –  districts with it.

Massachusetts elected its members November 6, 1820. Massachusetts had a majority requirement for election, which was not met in the  necessitating two additional elections on January 8, 1821, and April 16, 1821, after the term began but before the new Congress convened.

See also 
 1820 Massachusetts's 1st congressional district special election
 1820 Massachusetts's 8th congressional district special election
 1820 Massachusetts's 13th congressional district special election
 1820 and 1821 United States House of Representatives elections
 List of United States representatives from Massachusetts

Notes 

1820
Massachusetts
Massachusetts
United States House of Representatives
United States House of Representatives